The National Council for Higher Education is the parastatal responsible for accreditation of universities in Zimbabwe, under the Ministry of Higher and Tertiary Education.

See also 

Education in Zimbabwe

Education in Zimbabwe
Government of Zimbabwe